Prime Head is a prominent snow-covered headland which forms the Northern extremity of the Antarctic Peninsula. The name Siffrey was given to a cape in this vicinity by the French Antarctic Expedition under Capt. Jules Dumont d'Urville, 1837–40, and was previously approved for the feature here described. D'Urville's "Cap Siffrey" has since been identified by the UK-APC as a point two miles to the ESE, now called Siffrey Point. The name Prime Head, given by the UK-APC in 1963, alludes to the position of the headland as the first or northernmost feature of Antarctic Peninsula.

References

Headlands of Trinity Peninsula